Steven Andrew Balbus FRS (born 23 November 1953) is an American-born astrophysicist who is the Savilian Professor of Astronomy at the University of Oxford and a professorial fellow at New College, Oxford. In 2013, he shared the Shaw Prize for Astronomy with John F. Hawley.

Early life and education
Balbus was born in 1953 in Philadelphia, Pennsylvania. He attended the William Penn Charter School, received S.B. degrees in mathematics and 
in physics from the Massachusetts Institute of Technology (MIT) in 1975, and a PhD in theoretical astrophysics from the University of California, Berkeley in 1981.

Research and career
Following his PhD, Balbus held postdoctoral research appointments at MIT and Princeton University. In 1985, Balbus joined the faculty of the University of Virginia.  In 2004, he was appointed Professeur des Universités in the Physics Department of the École Normale Supérieure de Paris.  He remained
in Paris until 2012, when he moved to Oxford as the Savilian Professor of Astronomy.  At Oxford, he teaches astrophysical gas dynamics and supervises postdoctoral researchers
and students.

Balbus' research is in theoretical astrophysics. He has made discoveries related to gravitational instability in the interstellar medium and several contributions to the theory of thermal processes in magnetised dilute plasmas. He is best known for a 1991 paper, published with former colleague John F. Hawley, describing what is now known as magnetorotational instability (MRI). Most recently, Balbus has been working on a theory of the Sun's internal rotation. As of 2016, Balbus has also been lecturing an undergraduate course in general relativity at the University of Oxford; with several lectures coinciding with the discovery of gravitational waves in February 2016.

Awards and honours
Balbus was awarded a Chaire d'excellence in 2004 by the French Ministry of Higher Education. In 2013, he shared the Shaw Prize in Astronomy with Hawley for their work on the MRI. Considered one of the highest honours in astronomy, the prize included a US$1 million cash award. According to the Shaw selection committee the "discovery and elucidation of the magnetorotational instability (MRI)" solved the previously "elusive" problem of accretion, a widespread phenomenon in astrophysics and "provides what to this day remains the only viable mechanism for the outward transfer of angular momentum in accretion disks".

Balbus is the recipient of a Royal Society Wolfson Research Merit Award, and has held visiting faculty positions at Princeton University (Bohdan Paczynski Visitor and Spitzer Lecturer, 2011) and the University of California, Berkeley (Visiting Miller Professor, 2012).  In April 2015, Balbus was elected to the US National Academy of Sciences. He was elected a Fellow of the Royal Society (FRS) in 2016. In 2020 he was awarded the Eddington Medal of the Royal Astronomical Society, and in 2021 the Dirac Medal and Prize of the Institute of Physics.

References 

1953 births
Living people
Savilian Professors of Astronomy
University of Virginia faculty
Massachusetts Institute of Technology School of Science alumni
University of California, Berkeley alumni
Princeton University faculty
Fellows of the Royal Society